Charles William Billingsley (1 January 1910 – 4 November 1951) was an Irish cricketer. A right-handed batsman and right-arm fast-medium bowler, he made his debut for Ireland against the MCC at Lord's in August 1935, taking 5/54 when bowling in the MCC second innings, which were to remain his best bowling figures for Ireland.

He went on to play for Ireland on 13 occasions, his last match coming against Sir Julien Cahn's XI in August 1939. Five of his matches had first-class status.

References

CricketEurope Stats Zone profile

1910 births
1951 deaths
Irish cricketers
Cricketers from Belfast
Cricketers from Northern Ireland